Tom Watson (born February 21, 1962) is an American author, consultant and journalist.

Watson was born in Yonkers, New York.

He is the author of CauseWired: Plugging In, Getting Involved, Changing the World (Wiley, 2008), president of CauseWired, a consulting company he founded, and a columnist for Forbes.

References

 "A Letter to Readers: The Truth About @NY". @NY, January 1998.
 "Silicon Survivors". New York Magazine, April 1998.
 "Silicon Alley Struts Its Stuff". Wired, June 1998.
 "Silicon Alley's Political Shadow". Wired, September 2000.
 "Philanthropy, the eBay Way". MissionFish, November 2003.
 "For-profits finding nonprofit irresistible". The NonProfit Times, May 2004.
 
 "Consumers Rally to Cause Marketing". CNN, November 2006.
 "Tom Watson". GiftHub, October 2006.
 "Rich to the Rescue". Christian Science Monitor, December 2006.

External links
 My Dirty Life & Times by Tom Watson
 CauseWired
 The Riverdale Press

American male journalists
American bloggers
1962 births
Living people
Columbia College (New York) alumni
People from Yonkers, New York
21st-century American non-fiction writers
American male bloggers